Qaleh Dush (also Romanized as Qal‘eh Dūsh) is a village in Lisar Rural District, Kargan Rud District, Talesh County, Gilan Province, Iran. At the time of the 2006 census, its population was 369, in 98 families.

References 

Populated places in Talesh County